T. S. Muthaiah (1923 – 12 February 1992) was a Malayalam and Tamil film actor. He was a very popular actor in both film industries who usually played character and supporting roles in 1950s and 1960s.

Background
T. S. Muthaiah was born in 1923 to parents T.M.Sachith and  Gomathi Ammal in Kochi. His first film was Navalokam in 1951. He died in 1992.

Filmography

Director
 Ballatha Pahayan
 Chithramela

Actor

 Sreemad Bhagavadgeetha (1977)
 Pushpasharam (1976)
 Anubhavam (1976)
 Vanadevatha (1976) as  Prof Das
 Chirikkudukka (1976)
 Ozhukkinethire (1976)
 Pravaaham (1975) as Gopala Pilla
 Kalyaanappanthal (1975)
 Thiruvonam (1975)
 Love Marriage (1975) as RK Nair
 Paalazhi Madhanam (1975)
 Alibabayum 41 kallanmaarum (1975) as Rahman
 Chattambikkalyaani (1975) as Pareed
 Sindhu (1975) as Govinda Menon
 Babumon (1975) as Ashaan
 Ayodhya (1975)
 Ulsavam (1975) as Chief Engineer
 Ankathattu (1974)
 Panchathanthram (1974) as Dinesh Chandran
 Suprabhaatham (1974)
 Night Duty (1974)
 Pattabhishekam (1974) as Gopi Pilla
 Bhoogolam Thiriyunnu (1974)
 Ayalathe Sundari (1974) as Panikkar
 Arakkallan Mukkaalkkallan (1974)
 Chakravakam 1974) as Devassia's father
 College Girl (1974)
 Chandrakaantham (1974)
 Oru Pidi Ari (1974)
 Raajahamsam (1974)
 Kaamini (1974)
 Urvashi Bharathi (1973)
 Veendum Prabhatham (1973)
 Udayam (1973) as Vasu Pilla
 Kaalachakram (1973)
 Maram (1973) as Govindan Nair
 Nakhangal (1973)
 Bhadradeepam (1973) as Govinda Pilla
 Ladies Hostel (1973) as Raghavan
 Driksakshi (1973) as Sadanandan
Thottavadi (1973) as Priest
Thaniniram (1973) as P. K. Warrier
Interview (1973) as  Keshava Pilla
 Panchavadi (1973) as Thamarassery Kartha
 Brahmachaari (1972)
 Manthrakodi (1972)
 Maravil Thirivu Sookshikkuka (1972) as Muniyandi
 Nrithasaala (1972) as Govinda Panikkar
 Miss Mary (1972) as Paul
 Taxi Car (1972) as Father Frederick 
 Kandavarundo (1972)
 Sambhavami Yuge Yuge (1972) as Shivasankara Panikkar
 Lakshyam (1972)
 Pushpaanjali (1972) as Madhava Menon
 Gangaasangamam (1971)
 Manpeda (1971)
 Navavadhu (1971)
 Puthen Veedu (1971)
 Sindooracheppu 1971) as Appunni Kaimal
 Ernakulam Junction (1971) as Vasavan
 Yogamullaval (1971)
 Shiksha (1971) as Ramunni Menon
 C.I.D. in jungle (1971)
 Oru Penninte Katha (1971)
 Makane Ninakku Vendi (1971) as Peelippochan
 Vilaykku Vaangiya Veena (1971) as Raghava Panikkar
 Thapaswini (1971)
 Rathri Vandi (1971) as Peter 
 C.I.D. Nazir (1971) as Sankara Panikkar 
 Vivaaham Swargathil (1970)
 Ammayenna Sthree (1970)
 Bheekara Nimishangal (1970) as Vikraman Thampi
 Kalpana (1970)
 Sabarimala Sree Dharmashastha (1970)
 Detective 909 Keralathil (1970)
 Anaadha (1970)
 Palunku Paathram (1970)
 Vivaahitha (1970) as Meena's Father
 Virunnukari (1969) as Panikkar
 Pooja Pushpam (1969)
 Mooladhanam (1969) as Malathy's Father
 Agni Pareeksha (1968) as Raghavan
 Velutha Kathreena (1968) as Thevan
 Anchusundarikal (1968)
 Pengal (1968)
 Anaachadanam (1969)
 Collector Malathy (1967) as Chathan Master
 Iruttinte Athmavu(1967) as Rajan
 Anveshichu Kandethiyilla (1967)
 Udyogastha (1967)
 Agniputhri (1967) as Dr.Jayadevan
 Balyakalasakhi (1967)
 Pooja (1967)
 Ollathu Mathi (1967)
 Naadan Pennu (1967)
 Kudumbam (1967)
 Jeevikkaan Anuvadikkoo (1967)
Maadi Veettu Mappillai (1967) as Balu's Father
 Rowdy (1966)
 Kalyana Rathriyil (1966)
 Kanakachilanka (1966)
 Pinchuhridayam (1966)
 Kalithozhan (1966)
 Thankakudam (1965)
 Porter Kunjali (1965) as Kunjali
 Muthalali (1965)
 Kathirunna Nikah (1965)
 Rajamalli (1965)
 Inapraavugal (1965)
 Shyamala Chechi (1965)
 Devatha (1965)
 Kochumon (1965)
 Rosie (1965)
 Bhoomiyile Malakha (1965) as  Achuthan Nair
 Ore Bhoomi Ore Raktham (1964)
 Sree Guruvayoorappan (1964) as Melpathoor Narayana Battathiri
 Devaalayam (1964)
 Bharthavu (1964)
 Thayin Madiyil (1964) (Tamil)
 Kalanju Kittiya Thankam (1964) as Unnithan
 School Master (1964) as Sekharan Nair
 Oraal Koodi Kallanaayi (1964) as Govindan
 Chilamboli (1963)
 Doctor (1963) as Alex
 Swargarajyam (1962)
 Bhaagyajaathakam (1962)
 Laila Majnu (1962)
 Puthiya Akasam Puthiya Bhoomi (1962) as Sankarankutty Nair
 Krishna Kuchela(1961)
 Kandam Becha Kottu(1961) as Mammad
 Ummini Thanka (1961) as Ramayya
 Arappavan (1961) as Paramu
 Sthreehridayam (1960)
 Naadodikal (1959)
 Chathurangam (1959)
 Nairu Pidicha Pulivalu (1958) as Paithal Nair
 Mariakutty (1958) as Thoma
 Randidangazhi (1958)
 Padatha Painkili (1957) as  Lucko
 Achanum Makanum (1957)
 Jailppulli (1957) as Shekharan
 Deva Sundari (1957)
 Koodappirappu (1956)
 Manthravaadi (1956)
 Aathmaarpanam (1956)
 CID (1955)
 Aniyathi (1955) as Bhargavan
 Harishchandra(1955)
 Kaalam Maarunnu (1955)
 Avakasi (1954) as Kurup
 Baalyasakhi (1954) as Nair
 Ponkathir (1953)
 Lokaneethi (1953)
 Thiramala(1953)
 Amma (1952)
 Marumakal (1952)
 Aathmasakhi (1952)
 Navalokam (1951)

References

External links
metromatinee.com

 T. S. Muthaiah at MSI

Indian male film actors
Male actors from Kochi
Male actors in Malayalam cinema
1923 births
1992 deaths
20th-century Indian male actors